The Parliament of Antigua and Barbuda consists of the King of Antigua and Barbuda, the Senate and the House of Representatives.

The Parliament as a whole is charged with certain responsibilities and is given special powers and privileges in order to effectively carry out its functions. Included among the latter are freedom of speech in Parliament, the authority to regulate its business by standing orders, as well as the freedom from civil or criminal proceedings for words spoken or written by Members before their respective House. 

Parliament takes decisions relating to:

 the opening of Parliament in recourse to a call before His Majesty or his representative (except for cases provided for in the Constitution) ;
 the composition and powers of the local Council of Barbuda;
 arrangements governing the local government of this constituency.

Parliament has two chambers. The House of Representatives has 19 members, 17 members elected for a five year term in single-seat constituencies, 1 ex-officio member and 1 Speaker. The Senate has 17 appointed members.

The 16th Parliament of Antigua and Barbuda was sworn in on January 20, 2023.

See also

Politics of Antigua and Barbuda
List of legislatures by country

External links
Constitution of Antigua & Barbuda
Parliament of Antigua & Barbuda

Politics of Antigua and Barbuda
Antigua and Barbuda
Antigua
Parliament of Antigua and Barbuda